Edward Usher (June 19, 1898 – April 1973) was an American football fullback and halfback. He played college football for the Michigan Wolverines football team in 1918, 1920 and 1921.  He later played professional football in the National Football League (NFL) for the Buffalo All-Americans, Rock Island Independents, Green Bay Packers and Kansas City Blues for 3 seasons before retiring in 1924.

References

1898 births
1973 deaths
American football fullbacks
American football halfbacks
Buffalo All-Americans players
Green Bay Packers players
Kansas City Blues (NFL) players
Rock Island Independents players
Michigan Wolverines football players
Sportspeople from Toledo, Ohio
Players of American football from Ohio